The SEAL Recon Rifle (also known as the "Sniper M4" and "Recce") is a heavily modified M16-series rifle intended to provide US Navy SEAL snipers with a versatile, accurate, lightweight, and relatively compact weapon chambered in 5.56×45mm NATO.

History
The concept of a 5.56 NATO-based accurized rifle was first seen in 1993 when American troops were deployed in Somalia.

Development
Developed in-house by SEAL team armorers, the rifle's existence was centered less around a rigid specification and more around the concept of an accurized rifle that could share the duties and ammunition of fielded M4 carbines, whilst also being able to engage targets beyond the carbines' range.

When further development was handed over to Naval Surface Warfare Center Crane Division, the US Army incorporated their own concepts and funding into the joint program, resulting in the Mk 12 Special Purpose Rifle which many SEALs were disappointed with. 

Former SEAL Sniper Kyle Defoor recounts:

Specifications
Initially, SEAL Recon Rifles were built in-house with the only requirements being a 16" barrel (406mm), and the ability to shoot any 5.56×45mm cartridge in inventory, including the first iterations of the 77-grain (5 gram) Mk262 Mod0 cartridge.  Otherwise, the rifle was individualized to the tastes of the user by the armorer or the SEAL themselves.

The stainless-steel barrels were sourced from Lilja Precision Rifle Barrels, had a 1:8 (203mm) twist a unique heavy profile, beginning at 0.980 inches (25mm) in diameter for the first 2.60 inches (66mm) of length, then narrowing down to 0.850 inches (22mm) in diameter, 0.750 inches (19mm) in diameter underneath the front sight block, and 0.725 inches (18mm) in diameter to the muzzle. These barrels were mated to flat-top upper receivers featuring an M1913 rail, to which optics and back-up iron sights could be attached. Operators commonly chose to install back-up iron sights manufactured by Knight's Armament Company, ARMS Inc, and Troy Industries with the rifles. 

Recon rifles were reportedly fitted with free-float handguards, the most popular being the KAC M4 Match RAS and a longer-length LaRue free-float handguard, either of which provides plentiful rail space to mount accessories. KAC free-floated rails (P/N 20214) were part of the Mk12 Mod 1 package and were in common use by the Global War on Terror.  Barrels were sometimes fitted with Ops Inc. 12th model suppressors and their accompanying muzzle brakes.

See also
 Mk 12 Special Purpose Rifle

References

External links 
 SEAL Recon Rifle images and parts-list at CloneRifles.com.

5.56×45mm NATO firearms
Rifles of the United States
Designated marksman rifles
ArmaLite AR-10 derivatives